The 1950 Calama earthquake occurred near the Argentina–Chile border with an epicenter near Calama, Chile in the Atacama Desert on December 9. The event had a hypocenter depth of 113.9 km, beneath the Caichinque volcanic complex. It measured magnitude  8.2 on the moment magnitude scale, making it the largest intermediate depth earthquake ever recorded on Chilean soil.  One person was killed and an unspecified number of people were injured in Calama.

Tectonic setting
Earthquakes are frequent in Chile as it lies in the so-called Pacific Ring of Fire, where many of the world's active volcanoes and seismic activities are concentrated at. Off the coast of Chile, the Nazca Plate subducts beneath the South American Plate along the Peru–Chile or Atacama Megathrust, producing large earthquakes including the 1960 Chilean earthquake which had a magnitude of 9.5–9.6 on the moment magnitude scale.

In some cases, intraslab earthquakes occur. These earthquakes do not occur on the subduction interface; rather they happen as a result of faulting within the downgoing Nazca Plate. Intraslab earthquakes can occur anywhere within the slab, which may be deeper than 600 km.

Earthquake
The quake was an intermediate-depth event which ruptured within the Nazca Plate. There, the plate dips at an angle of 20°–30° to the east, beneath the South American Plate. This was the result of extensional stress acting on the Nazca Plate at an intermediate depth. It is the only earthquake with a rupture entirely beneath a continent rather than offshore. Based on its large seismic magnitude, the rupture area is estimated to be 6,000 km2, breaking through the thickness of the Nazca Plate along a vertically-dipping normal fault.

See also 
 List of earthquakes in 1950
 List of earthquakes in Chile
 List of earthquakes in Argentina

References 

Earthquakes in Chile
Earthquakes in Argentina
1950 in Chile
1950 in Argentina
1950 earthquakes
History of Antofagasta Region
1950 disasters in Chile
1950 disasters in Argentina
1950 disasters in South America